The 1948 United States Senate election in New Hampshire took place on November 2, 1948. Incumbent Republican Senator Styles Bridges won re-election to a third term in office, defeating Democrat Alfred Fortin.

Primary elections were held on September 14, 1948.

Republican primary

Candidates
Styles Bridges, incumbent Senator since 1937

Results

Democratic primary

Candidates
Alfred E. Fortin
Joseph A. Millimet

Results

General election

Candidates
Styles Bridges, incumbent Senator since 1937 (Republican)
Alfred E. Fortin (Democratic)

Results

See also 
 1948 United States Senate elections

References

Bibliography
 

1948
New Hampshire
United States Senate